The men's middleweight (75 kilograms) event at the 2014 Asian Games took place from 25 September to 3 October 2014 at Seonhak Gymnasium, Incheon, South Korea.

Schedule
All times are Korea Standard Time (UTC+09:00)

Results 
Legend
DSQ — Won by disqualification
KO — Won by knockout
TKOI — Won by technical knockout injury

Final

Top half

Bottom half

References

Results

External links
Official website

Boxing at the 2014 Asian Games